Team Wales represents Wales in men's international roller derby.  The team was first formed in 2013 to compete in the inaugural Men's Roller Derby World Cup on the 4th-6 March 2014 in Birmingham, England. Players attended tryouts throughout July and August 2013, and were scouted from the Men's European Roller Derby Championships 2013.

Current team roster
The final line-up was announced in August 2013; more than half the skaters selected for the team were from the South Wales Silures.

Coaching staff
Peter Butler (Neil Helado) - Bench Coach
Billie Pistol - Lineup Manager
Oon Robbins - Assistant Coach

MRDWC 2014
The Wales National squad started the tournament in Red Group, with pool matches against eventual winners Team USA and Finland.

G: Wales 107 Finland 35
G: Wales 13 USA 217

Wales then drew Canada in the quarter finals:

Q: Wales 46 Canada 281

Wales were then knocked down into the Plate Semi-finals and played nearby neighbours Power of Scotland:

S: Wales 245 Scotland 123

Upon winning that game they finally drew the Wizards of Aus (Australia) in the Plate Final:

P: Wales 200 Australia 201

Wales finished the tournament 6th in the World and 3rd in Europe.

References

Men's national team
National roller derby teams
2013 establishments in Wales
National sports teams established in 2013
R